The Consumer Goods Forum is a global organization of 400 consumer goods companies with the likes of Amazon and Kellogg being involved. It represents combined sales of 2.5 trillion Euros across 70 countries and 10 million employees.

Overview
The CGF was formed in 2009. It is headquartered in Paris, and has regional offices in Washington, D.C. and Tokyo.

Alongside the USAID, it has vowed to reduce deforestation. It also vowed to reduce Hydrofluorocarbons from refrigeration at the 2010 United Nations Climate Change Conference.

References

Organizations established in 2009
Lobbying organizations